Roy and Iris Corbin Lustron House, also known as the Corbin-Featherstone House, is a historic home located at Indianapolis, Marion County, Indiana.  It was built in 1949, and is a one-story, side gabled Lustron house. It is constructed of steel and is sided and roofed with porcelain enameled steel panels.  It sits on a poured concrete pad and measures 1,085 square feet.  A garage was added to the house in the 1950s.  It is one of about 30 Lustron houses built in Marion County.

It was added to the National Register of Historic Places in 1997.

References

Houses on the National Register of Historic Places in Indiana
Lustron houses
Houses completed in 1949
Houses in Indianapolis
National Register of Historic Places in Indianapolis